A welcoming congregation can be:

 Any of several LGBT-affirming religious groups and their LGBT welcoming programs such as, 
Unitarian Universalist (UU) communities that have gone through the UU Welcoming Congregation program